Neobrachypoda is a genus of mites belonging to the family Axonopsidae.

The species of this genus are found in Northern Europe.

Species:
 Neobrachypoda ekmani (Walter)

References

Trombidiformes
Trombidiformes genera